The following United States Army units and commanders fought in the Battle of Williamsburg of the American Civil War. The Confederate order of battle is shown separately.

Abbreviations used

Military rank
 MG = Major General
 BG = Brigadier General
 Col = Colonel
 Ltc = Lieutenant Colonel
 Maj = Major
 Cpt = Captain
 Lt = Lieutenant
 Bvt = Brevet

Other
 w = wounded
 mw = mortally wounded
 k = killed

Army of the Potomac

MG George B. McClellan
Commanding in the field: BG Edwin V. Sumner

III Corps

BG Samuel P. Heintzelman

IV Corps

BG Erasmus D. Keyes

Cavalry Advanced Guard
BG George Stoneman

References
 Hastings, Earl C. and David S. Hastings. A Pitiless Rain: The Battle of Williamsburg, 1862. Shippensburg, Pennsylvania; White Mane Publishing Company, 1997. 
 
 Robert Underwood Johnson, Clarence Clough Buell, Battles and Leaders of the Civil War, Volume 2 (Pdf), New York: The Century Co., 1887.

American Civil War orders of battle